Paolo Bussetti was an Italian swimmer. He competed in men's 200 metre backstroke and men's 200 metre freestyle events at the 1900 Summer Olympics.

References

External links
 

Year of birth missing
Year of death missing
Italian male swimmers
Italian male backstroke swimmers
Italian male freestyle swimmers
Olympic swimmers of Italy
Swimmers at the 1900 Summer Olympics
Place of birth missing
Place of death missing
20th-century Italian people